"Stone the Crow" is a song by American heavy metal band Down and a single from their 1995 debut album, NOLA. It peaked at No. 40 on the US Mainstream Rock charts. A video was also produced for the song.

Music video

In an interview, guitarist Pepper Keenan was asked about the music video:

Release and reception
The song was released as the second single for the band's debut album and became their first and only radio hit, reaching No. 40 on the US Mainstream Rock Tracks. The song is a staple at live shows and is regularly played as the second to last song.

Chart positions

References

1995 songs
1995 singles
Down (band) songs
East West Records singles
Songs written by Phil Anselmo